Rose Mary Almanza Blanco (born 13 July 1992) is a Cuban middle-distance runner who competes in the 800 metres. She represented Cuba at the Pan American Games in 2011, 2015, 2019 and won medals at the Ibero-American and Central American and Caribbean Championships in Athletics.She was world champion in the 4x400 meter relay in Silesia 2021

Career
Almanza ran internationally from a young age, coming fourth at the 2009 World Youth Championships in Athletics before taking the 800 m title at the Pan American Junior Championships. She won at the Barrientos Memorial in March 2010 and followed this with a personal best of 2:03.03 to take the silver medal at the 2010 Ibero-American Championships in Athletics. She ran a national junior record of 2:02.04 in Havana in July and came fourth at the 2010 World Junior Championships in Athletics.

In 2011, she improved her record further to 2:00.56 and won her first senior regional medal at the 2011 Central American and Caribbean Championships in Athletics, placing second in the 800 m behind Gabriela Medina. She came close to a medal at the 2011 Pan American Games, but was edged into fourth place in the final.

She began 2012 in strong form, taking silver medals in the 800 m and 4×400 metres relay at the Ibero-American Championships. A run of 1:59.55 in Havana was enough to gain her a place on the Cuban squad for the 2012 London Olympics.

Almanza continued to perform at a high level in subsequent years. She set a 1:57.70 personal best in 2015, participated in the 2016 Rio Olympics and won the 800m title in the 2017 Summer Universiade.

By June 2021, Almanza had returned to career-best form in the 800m, running another personal best and world-leading time of 1:56.42 in Ordizia, Spain.

Personal bests

International competitions

References

External links
 
 

Living people
1992 births
Sportspeople from Camagüey
Cuban female middle-distance runners
Athletes (track and field) at the 2011 Pan American Games
Athletes (track and field) at the 2019 Pan American Games
Pan American Games silver medalists for Cuba
Pan American Games medalists in athletics (track and field)
World Athletics Championships athletes for Cuba
Athletes (track and field) at the 2016 Summer Olympics
Olympic athletes of Cuba
Universiade medalists in athletics (track and field)
Competitors at the 2014 Central American and Caribbean Games
Competitors at the 2018 Central American and Caribbean Games
Central American and Caribbean Games gold medalists for Cuba
Universiade gold medalists for Cuba
Central American and Caribbean Games medalists in athletics
Medalists at the 2017 Summer Universiade
Medalists at the 2019 Pan American Games
Athletes (track and field) at the 2020 Summer Olympics
21st-century Cuban women